Pierre de Roquefeuil-Montpeyroux  was a French Navy officer. He served during the War of American Independence.

Biography 
Roquefeuil was born in 1735 to the House of Roquefeuil-Blanquefort. He grew up in Montpeyroux, Aveyron where his family owned the Château du Bousquet.

On 19 September 1749, he joined the French Navy as a Garde-Marine. He was promoted to lieutenant on 1 May 1763.

In 1773, he was made a Knight in the Order of Saint Louis.

On 4 April 1777, he was promoted to captain  and given command of the 32-gun frigate Oiseau. He served 
Du Chaffault.

In 1778, named flag captain on the 80-gun ship Saint-Esprit,  Roquefeuil participated to the battle of Ushant under Lamotte-Picquet.

In 1779, he was given command of the frigate Renommée, with which he captured two British ships. He then transferred to the 74-gun Zodiaque.

From 1781, he commanded the 74-gun Dauphin Royal. He took part in the Battle of the Saintes on 12 April 1782, and was later cleared by the inquiry into the battle.

In 1783, he earned a membership in the Society of the Cincinnati.

He retired on 8 February 1786 with the rank of brigadier des armées navales, on medical grounds.

Pierre de Roquefeuil-Montpeyroux died in 1789  in Brittany.

Family 
In 1783, Roquefeuil married Léocadie de Lagadec  with whom he had two children:

 Adolphe, 
 Alphonse-Louis.

Pierre de Roquefeuil-Montpeyroux is also the nephew of:

 Jacques Aymar de Roquefeuil et du Bousquet (1665-1744), 
 Aymar Joseph de Roquefeuil et du Bousquet (1714-1782).

Sources and references 
 Notes

Citations

References
 
 
 

French Navy officers
Roquefeuil-Montpeyroux, Pierre de
French military personnel of the American Revolutionary War
1735 births
1789 deaths